The Ronde van Overijssel was an elite women's professional one-day road bicycle race held in the Netherlands in 2014 and 2015, and was rated by the UCI as a 1.1 race.

Past winners

References

External links

Cycle races in the Netherlands
Women's road bicycle races
Ronde van Overijssel